Jodhpur railway division is one of the four railway divisions under North Western Railway zone of Indian Railways. This railway division was formed on 5 November 1951 and its headquarters are located at Jodhpur in the state of Rajasthan of India.

Jaipur railway division,  Bikaner railway division and Ajmer railway division are the other three railway divisions under NWR Zone headquartered at  Jaipur.

Rail transport infrastructure 
The zone has the following types of locomotive engines:
(Legends: W - broad gauge, D - diesel, G - goods, M - mixed, P - passenger) 
 Bhagat Ki Kothi railway station (BGKT) sheds at Jodhpur: WDM2, WDG's, WDP4's, WDM3A's

Medical Facilities 
For the employees and their families, the division also has the following healthcare facilities:
 Zonal Hospitals 
 Jaipur Zonal Railway Hospital near Jaipur Junction railway station 
 Divisional Hospitals 
 Jodhpur Divisional Railway Hospital near Jodhpur Junction railway station
 Sub-Divisional Hospitals 
 Udaipur Sub-Divisional Railway Hospital near Rana Pratap Nagar railway station at Udaipur (Jodhpur division) 
 Health Units, several (total 29 across the whole division, including 3 other zones)
 First Aid Posts, unknown (no more than a total of two across the whole zone)

Training 
The zone has the following training institutes:
 Divisional Training Centre(Engineering), Jodhpur
 Carriage & Wagon Training Centre, Jodhpur
 Diesel Traction Training Centre, Bhagat Ki Kothi, Jodhpur
 Personnel Training Centre, Jodhpur
 Transportation Training Centre, Jodhpur
 Basic Training Centre, Jodhpur

Route and Track Length 
 North Western Railway zone
 Route km: broad gauge , metre gauge , total  
 Track km: broad gauge , metre gauge , total 

 Jodhpur railway division
 Route km: broad gauge 1,568 km, metre gauge 0 km, total  
 Track km: broad gauge , metre gauge 0 km, total

List of railway stations and towns 
The list includes the stations under the Jodhpur railway division and their station category. 

Stations closed for Passengers -

References

 
Divisions of Indian Railways
1951 establishments in Rajasthan